"Ladro di fiori" is a song by Italian singer Blanco. It was released as a single on 20 October 2020 by Island Records and included in Blanco's debut album Blu celeste. It was written by Blanco and Michelangelo, and produced by Michelangelo.

The song peaked at number 16 on the FIMI single chart and was certified platinum in Italy.

Music video
The music video for "Ladro di fiori", directed by Simone Peluso, was released on 20 October 2020 via Blanco's YouTube channel. , the video has over 12 million views on YouTube.

Personnel
Credits adapted from Tidal.
 Michelangelo – producer and composer
 Blanco – associated performer, author, vocals

Charts

Weekly charts

Year-end charts

Certifications

References

2020 singles
2020 songs
Island Records singles
Blanco (singer) songs
Songs written by Blanco (singer)